Noel Edward Hill (1927-1965) was an Australian rugby league footballer who played in the 1940s and 1950s in the New South Wales premiership competition.

Career
A south coast junior, Hill was a halfback for St. George for three seasons between 1948-1950. He won a premiership with St George, playing halfback in the 1949 Grand Final victory over South Sydney.

In 1951, Hill returned to Thirroul, and was selected for NSW Country in 1952 and 1953, captaining that representative side in 1952.

Death
Hill died of a cerebral hemorrhage in South Melbourne on 24 September 1965. A son and a daughter survived him. He was buried at Melbourne General Cemetery, Carlton on 28 September 1965.

References

St. George Dragons players
Australian rugby league players
1927 births
1965 deaths
Rugby league halfbacks
Rugby league players from New South Wales
Country New South Wales rugby league team